The 1987 edition of the Campeonato Carioca kicked off on February 8, 1987 and ended on August 9, 1987. It is the official tournament organized by FFERJ (Federação de Futebol do Estado do Rio de Janeiro, or Rio de Janeiro State Football Federation. Only clubs based in the Rio de Janeiro State are allowed to play. Fourteen teams contested this edition. Vasco da Gama won the title for the 16th time. Campo Grande, Mesquita, Olaria and Portuguesa were relegated.

System
The tournament would be divided in four stages:
 Taça Guanabara: The fourteen teams all played in a single round-robin format against each other. The champions qualified to the Final phase. 
 Taça Rio: The fourteen teams all played in a single round-robin format against each other. The champions qualified to the Final phase and the four best teams qualified to the Third round.
 Third round: The remaining four teams all played in a single round-robin format against each other. The champions qualified to the Final phase.
 Final phase: The champions of each of the three stages would play that phase. each team played in a single round-robin format against each other and the team with the most points won the title.

Championship

Taça Guanabara

Taça Rio

Aggregate table

Third phase

Final phase

References

Campeonato Carioca seasons
Carioca